Bernardo Pereira Silvano (born 14 April 1996), commonly known as Benny is a Portuguese footballer who plays for União de Leiria as a centre back.

Club career
Born in Leiria, Benny started his career with the youth setup of local club União de Leiria and was promoted to the senior squad in 2014 which played in the third tier. On 31 January 2017, he joined Benfica Castelo Branco of the same tier.

On 19 June 2017, Benny moved a tier up and moved to Arouca. On 26 November, he made his league debut, playing the whole 90 minutes of a 2–0 victory against Santa Clara.

Club statistics

References

External links

1996 births
People from Leiria
Living people
Association football defenders
Portuguese footballers
U.D. Leiria players
Sport Benfica e Castelo Branco players
F.C. Arouca players
S.C.U. Torreense players
Liga Portugal 2 players
Segunda Divisão players
Campeonato de Portugal (league) players
Sportspeople from Leiria District